2NE1 (also known as 2NE1 2nd Mini Album) is the second eponymous extended play by South Korean girl group 2NE1. It was released digitally and physically on July 28, 2011, by YG Entertainment and was distributed by KMP Holdings. It contains six songs composed and produced by Teddy Park and Kush; five of them were released as digital singles. "Don't Stop the Music" was initially released as the Yamaha Fiore CF Theme Song in late 2010. A Japanese version of the mini-album, titled Nolza, was released by YGEX on September 21, 2011.

Both versions of the extended play experienced commercial success, achieving number one on both the weekly and monthly Gaon Album Charts in South Korea as well topping the Oricon Albums Chart in Japan. Four of its singles—"Don't Cry", "Lonely", "I Am the Best", "Ugly"—each claimed the number one position on the Gaon Digital Chart, making 2NE1 the first group to have four number-one songs from the same album. The mini-album won the Album of the Year award at the 2011 Melon Music Awards, while "I Am the Best" won Song of the Year at the 2011 Mnet Asian Music Awards in addition to the group's second accolade from the Korean Music Awards.

Development and background
On April 18, 2011, 2NE1 announced they would postpone their Japanese debut due to the 2011 Tōhoku earthquake and tsunami and would resume Korean release plans, pushing the extended play's promotions forward, from April to July.

Plans for the album's promotions were later released on YG Life's blog on April 27, 2011, where the group stated that they we will be releasing a new single every three weeks leading up to the album's release in July. The group stated that the reason behind this plan was because they were more than satisfied with the level of quality in the album's track list and intended to use them all as title tracks for its promotion.

Promotion and release

Bom's solo track "Don't Cry" was released as the first single on April 21. It was then followed by the group's single "Lonely" on May 11. Both songs topped the Gaon Digital Chart; in addition, "Lonely" became the first song to achieve a perfect all-kill by a K-pop girl group since the concept's inception in 2010. Neither were promoted extensively on music shows; but on May 29, the group made a surprise two-part performance with both songs on SBS's Inkigayo. The surprise appearance was attributed to the popularity of the two songs and was done as a gift to their fans.

On June 24, the third single "I Am The Best" was released at midnight, and subsequently topped all South Korean real-time charts, achieving another perfect all-kill. The song gained international recognition and is often referred to as one of the most iconic and influential songs in K-pop. It was performed for several weeks on the music programs Inkigayo, Show! Music Core and M Countdown. The plans for a mini album then stated another digital single would soon follow along with the release of the group's second mini album.

"Hate You", was initially intended for their second album To Anyone, but was later included into the mini-album's tracklist. It was released one week prior to the mini album's release on July 21 and became a top-three hit. The next single "Ugly", became the EP's fourth number one single, and won three music program wins during the course of its run. It ended the album's promotions on SBS's Inkigayo on August 21.

Following their Korean promotions, the group announced the release of the album in Japan under the title Nolza. It was released on September 21 by YGEX, a newly created label by YG Entertainment Japan in association with Avex. They appeared on the Japanese music program Music Station to promote the EP, performing the lead single "I Am the Best".

Reception

Recognition
The album ranked sixth on Spin magazine's list of "20 Best Pop Albums of 2011", placing ahead of Ellie Goulding, Coldplay and Rihanna. The publication said that "it might be the year’s most boldly thrilling recorded statement", featuring the collision of various genres, from electro-house, hip-hop, and pop-rock guitar. In 2012, the same publication ranked "Ugly" at number 9 and "I Am the Best" at number 3 in their list of 21 Greatest K-pop Songs of All Time, while Stereogum included both songs in their list of 20 Best K-pop Music Videos at number 6 and 1, respectively. FrancoMusique named the EP one of the 20 best albums of the decade, writing that the "six-song EP would go down in history" as "[2NE1] became K-pop queens overnight."

Commercial performance
2NE1 2nd Mini Album debuted at number one on the Gaon Album Chart in the chart issue dated July 24–30, 2011. It was the top-selling album in the month of July with 54,900 copies being sold in just three days. The singles off of 2NE1 showed to be some of the most popular songs in South Korea during 2011; "Lonely", "Don't Cry" and "I Am the Best" were ranked 4th, 5th and 7th on the year-end Gaon Digital Chart, respectively. "Ugly" and "Hate You" additionally ranked within the top 50. In Japan, Nolza claimed the top spot on the weekly Japanese Oricon album chart, and became the second South Korean girl group album to do so in the chart's history. 

In Taiwan, the mini-album debuted atop the G-Music East Asia album chart in the issue dated August 26 – September 1, 2011, making it the group's first number-one album in the country. It additionally peaked at number 12 on the Combo album chart during the same week. In the United States, the mini-album peaked at number 4 on the Billboard US World Albums chart and number 34 on the Top Heatseekers Album chart.

Accolades

Track listing

Korean EP – 2NE1 2nd Mini Album

Japanese EP – Nolza

Chart performance

Korean version (2NE1 2nd Mini Album)

Japanese version (Nolza)

Year-end charts (2NE1)

Sales and certifications

Release history

References

External links
 2NE1 official site

2NE1 albums
2011 EPs
YG Entertainment EPs
KMP Holdings EPs
Korean-language EPs
Albums produced by Teddy Park